In the Battle of Ba'rin, also known as Battle of Montferrand) in 1137, a Crusader force commanded by King Fulk of Jerusalem was scattered and defeated by Zengi, the atabeg of Mosul and Aleppo. This setback resulted in the permanent loss of the Crusader castle of Montferrand in Baarin.

Background
When Zengi became ruler of Mosul in 1127 and Aleppo in 1128, the Crusaders were faced with a dangerous opponent. For several years afterward, Zengi gained power at the expense of neighboring Muslim states. By occasionally allying itself with the Latin Kingdom of Jerusalem, the Muslim emirate of Damascus successfully resisted Zengi's efforts to conquer that city.

Battle
In 1137, Zengi invested the castle of Ba'rin, about 10 miles northwest of Homs. Raymond II managed to obtain help from King Fulk, however when Fulk arrived in Tripoli he learned that the Principality of Antioch was being invaded by the Byzantine Emperor. Fulk immediately held a council and decided that Ba’rin should be helped first. The Franks advanced against Zengi, whereupon Zengi decimated their infantry. Raymond II and some of his knights were captured while Fulk recognised the futility of any further resistance and retired into the fortress with the loss of all of the baggage intended for Ba’rin. The Christian chronicler William of Tyre "gave no tactical information, and neither did the Arab historians." Zengi then resumed his siege of Ba’rin while the imprisoned Franks appealed for aid to Antioch, Jerusalem and Edessa, all of whom answered the appeal.

Aftermath 
After their defeat, Fulk and some of the survivors took refuge in Montferrand castle, which Zengi surrounded again. "When they ran out of food they ate their horses, and then they were forced to ask for terms." Meanwhile, large numbers of Christian pilgrims had rallied to the army of Byzantine Emperor John II Comnenus, Raymond of Antioch and Joscelin II of Edessa. 

With this host approaching the castle, Zengi suddenly granted Fulk and the other besieged Franks terms. In return for their freedom and evacuation of the castle, a ransom was set at 50000 dinar. The Franks, unaware of the imminent arrival of the large relieving army, accepted Zengi's offer. 

In April 1137, John Comnenus laid siege to Shaizar but his efforts came to nothing when Zengi relieved the city in May. Ba'rin was never recovered by the Franks.

Muhammad ibn Nasr ibn al-Qaysarani wrote a rhyming poem praising Zengi for his victory at Ba'rin.

References
 Gabrieli, Francesco. Arab Historians of the Crusades. University of California Press, 1969. 
 Hermes, Nizar F. "The Poet(ry) of Frankish Enchantment: The Ifranjiyyāt of Ibn Qaysarānī". Middle Eastern Literatures. 20.3 (2017): 267–287. 
 Smail, R. C. Crusading Warfare, 1097–1193. New York: Barnes & Noble Books, (1956) 1995.

Footnotes

Battles involving the Kingdom of Jerusalem
Battles involving the Zengid dynasty
Battles involving the Seljuk Empire
Conflicts in 1137
12th century in the Kingdom of Jerusalem
12th century in the Seljuk Empire
1130s in the Kingdom of Jerusalem
1137 in Asia